Calliotropis ammos is a species of sea snail, a marine gastropod mollusc in the family Eucyclidae.

Distribution
This species occurs in the Pacific Ocean off Tuamotu, French Polynesia.

References

External links
 To World Register of Marine Species

ammos
Gastropods described in 2012